Juan Ramón Fleita (born May 23, 1972, in Santa Fe, Argentina) is a former Argentine footballer who played for clubs in Argentina, Chile, Mexico, Bolivia, Paraguay, Uruguay, Venezuela and Guatemala.

Teams

External links
 

1972 births
Living people
Argentine footballers
Argentine expatriate footballers
Club Atlético Huracán footballers
Racing Club de Avellaneda footballers
San Lorenzo de Almagro footballers
Club Guaraní players
C.A. Bella Vista players
The Strongest players
Coquimbo Unido footballers
Comunicaciones F.C. players
Liga MX players
Expatriate footballers in Chile
Expatriate footballers in Mexico
Expatriate footballers in Bolivia
Expatriate footballers in Uruguay
Expatriate footballers in Paraguay
Expatriate footballers in Venezuela
Expatriate footballers in Guatemala
Toros Neza footballers
Racing Club de Avellaneda managers
Association footballers not categorized by position
Argentine football managers
Footballers from Santa Fe, Argentina